Perry Township is one of twenty townships in Allen County, Indiana, United States. As of the 2010 census, its population was 29,158, up from 18,170 in 2000.

History
The Dutch Ridge Historic District and Fisher West Farm are listed on the National Register of Historic Places.  The Irene Byron Tuberculosis Sanatorium-Physician Residences were listed between 2004 and 2013.

Geography

Cities, towns, villages
 Fort Wayne (north edge)
 Huntertown (northeast three-quarters)

Unincorporated towns
 Cedar Canyons at 
 Royville at 
(This list is based on USGS data and may include former settlements.)

Adjacent townships
 Butler Township, DeKalb County (north)
 Jackson Township, DeKalb County (northeast)
 Cedar Creek Township (east)
 St. Joseph Township (southeast)
 Washington Township (southwest)
 Eel River Township (west)
 Swan Township, Noble County (northwest)

Cemeteries
The township contains Huntertown Cemetery.

Major highways

Airports and landing strips
 Exner Airport

School districts
 Northwest Allen County Schools

Political districts
 Indiana's 3rd congressional district
 State House District 85
 State Senate District 14
 State Senate District 15

References

Citations

References
 United States Census Bureau 2008 TIGER/Line Shapefiles
 United States Board on Geographic Names (GNIS)
 IndianaMap

Townships in Allen County, Indiana
Fort Wayne, IN Metropolitan Statistical Area
Townships in Indiana